Sara Berkeley (born 1967 Dublin) is an Irish poet, long resident in the US, where she works as a hospice nurse.

Life 
Sara Berkeley grew up in Ireland, and attended secondary school at Manor House School, Raheny.

After 30 years in the San Francisco Bay Area, she now lives in the Hudson Valley in upstate New York, where she works full time as a hospice nurse. She has a 30+ year publishing history on both sides of the Atlantic, including seven collections of poetry, a collection of short stories, and a novel. 

Her work has been widely anthologized and published in magazines and journals. In 2002, she was nominated for a Pushcart Prize. She has taken part in numerous festivals and shows, such as the 2003 San Francisco International Poetry Festival, the 2006 Dublin Writers’ Festival, and the 2012 International Mexican Poetry Festival. In 2010, fifteen of her poems were anthologized in Harvard University Press's An Anthology of Modern Irish Poetry. In 2011, she was nominated for the Irish Times Poetry Now award, alongside Seamus Heaney.

Works

Poetry
Penn (poetry), Raven Arts Press (Dublin)/Thistledown Press (Saskatchewan), 1986.
Home-Movie Nights Raven Arts, 1989,  
Facts About Water Bloodaxe Books, 1994, 
Strawberry Thief, Gallery Press, 2005, 
The View From Here, Gallery Press, 2010, 
What Just Happened, Sentient Publications, 2016, 
The Last Cold Day, Gallery Press, 2022,

Short fiction
The Swimmer in the Deep Blue Dream Raven Arts Press, 1992,

Novel
Shadowing Hannah, New Island Press, 1999

References 

1967 births
People educated at Manor House School, Raheny
Irish women poets
Writers from Dublin (city)
Writers from San Francisco
Living people